Stadion pod Hrádkem, also known as Areál Vodranty, is a football stadium in Čáslav, Czech Republic. It is the home stadium of FC Zenit Čáslav. The stadium holds 2,575 spectators, of which 575 can be seated.

External links
 Information at FC Zenit Čáslav website
 Stadium information

Football venues in the Czech Republic
FK Čáslav